Mackay Christian College is a coeducational independent Christian school based in North Mackay in the Mackay Region in Queensland, Australia. The college is situated across two campuses, with the Providence Campus situated on Ambrose Way and the Kings Park Campus situated on Quarry Street. The Providence Campus accommodates students from Pre-Prep to Year 6 whereas the Kings Park Campus accommodates students from Years 7 to 12.

Curriculum

Providence Campus

Early Learning
Mackay Christian College's Providence Campus includes a Pre-Prep Learning Centre, which includes three classroom spaces and an outdoor shaded play area.

Junior School
Mackay Christian College's Providence Campus's primary school facilities consist of 21 classrooms from Prep to Year 6, a music room, a library, an auditorium, a sports oval and multiple playground areas.

Kings Park Campus

Middle school
Students in the Middle School phase (Years 7–9) undertake the core subjects of English, Mathematics, Science, Humanities and Health & Physical Education. Each Year 7 students also undertakes four semester-long elective subjects whereas Years 8 and 9 students undertake three year-long elective subjects. Elective subjects available to Middle School students include:

 Agriculture
 Art
 Business Studies (Years 8 & 9 only)
 Design Technologies
 Drama
 Home Economics
 Industrial Technologies
 Multimedia
 Music

Senior School
Year 10

Year 10 students at Mackay Christian College undertake the core subjects of English and Mathematics. Each student is placed in one of the three Mathematics classes (Preparatory Mathematical Methods, Preparatory General Mathematics or Preparatory Essential Mathematics) based on their Year 9 Mathematics results. Other subjects available to Year 10 students include:

 Agriculture
 Design Technology
 Drama
 Health & Physical Education
 General Health & Physical Education
 Adventure Challenge
 Home Economics
 Humanities
 Industrial Technologies
 Multimedia
 Music
 Science
 General Science
 Biology
 Chemistry
 Physics
 Visual Arts

Years 11 & 12

Years 11 and 12 students at Mackay Christian College have opportunities to participate in General and Applied subjects as well as Vocational Education & Training courses.

General subjects include:

 Drama
 English
 Film, TV & New Media
 Humanities
 Legal Studies
 Modern History
 Mathematics
 General Mathematics
 Mathematical Methods
 Specialist Mathematics
 Music
 Physical Education
 Science
 Agricultural Science
 Biology
 Chemistry
 Physics

Applied subjects include:

 Essential English
 Essential Mathematics
 Hospitality Practices
 Industrial Graphics Skills
 Sport & Recreation
 Visual Arts in Practice

Vocational Education & Training courses include:
 Certificate I in Construction (CPC10111)
 Certificate II in Engineering Pathways (MEM20413)
 Certificate II in Rural Operations (AHC21216)

Extracurricular activities
 Academic competitions for students Years 6 to 12 with a proficiency in Mathematics, English and Science
 Adventure Club
 Aero Club
 Cattle Show Team
 Chess clubs; Junior School Chess Club and Middle & Senior School Chess Club
 Choirs; Year 3 Choir, Year 4/5 Choir, Year 6/7 Choir and Song and Dance Club
 Club sports; Basketball, Girls' Soccer, Netball, Rugby League, Rugby Union, Tennis and Touch Football
 Creative Academy instrumental program
 Creative Art Class & Gallery
 Drama Club (Years 11 and 12 students only)
 F1 in Schools Technology Challenge
 Festival of Fashion
 Missions; Local Outreach, Indigenous Outreach and International Missions
 MTB School of Excellence
 Multimedia Camp
 Robotics Club
 ZACH MACH (Mackay Adventure Challenge)

References

External links
 

Nondenominational Christian schools in Queensland
Schools in Mackay, Queensland
Educational institutions established in 1984
1984 establishments in Australia